Dmitri Aleksandrovich Vakhlakov (born 27 July 1980) is a former Russian professional football player.

Club career
He played in the Russian Football National League for FC Tekstilshchik Ivanovo in 2007.

References

External links
 

1980 births
Sportspeople from Ivanovo
Living people
Russian footballers
Association football defenders
FC Salyut Belgorod players
FC Tekstilshchik Ivanovo players
FC Torpedo Vladimir players